Paratheta is a genus of moths in the family Cosmopterigidae.

Species
Paratheta calyptra  Lower, 1899
Paratheta lasiomela  Lower, 1899
Paratheta ochrocoma  Lower, 1899

References

Cosmopteriginae